Chakhmaq Bolagh-e Sofla (also Romanized as Chakhmāq Bolāgh-e Soflá; also known as Chakhmakh-bulag-Ashagi, Chakhmāq Bolāgh-e Ashāqi, Chakhmāq Bolāgh-e Pā'īn, Chakhmāq Bolāgh Pā’īn, Chākhmāqbolāq-e Soflā, Chaqmāq Bulāgh Ashāghi, and Khomāq Bolāgh-e Ashāqi) is a village in Mavazekhan-e Shomali Rural District, Khvajeh District, Heris County, East Azerbaijan Province, Iran. At the 2006 census, its population was 98, in 22 families.

References 

Populated places in Heris County